Băneasa (historical name:  Parachioi) is a commune in Constanța County, Northern Dobruja, Romania. It held the rank of town between 10 April 2004 and 17 January 2019, when it was reclassified following a local referendum held on 11 June 2017.

Administration
Besides Băneasa, the following villages are also part of the commune:
 Negureni (historical name: Caranlâc)
 Făurei (historical name: Calaicea) - named probably after Făurei, Brăila County
 Tudor Vladimirescu (historical name: Regep Cuius) - named after Tudor Vladimirescu, a Wallachian revolutionary

The former village of Cărpiniș (historical name: Ghiuvegea) was merged with the village of Băneasa by the 1968 administrative reform.

Demographics
At the 2002 census, Băneasa had 4374 Romanians (81.8%), 963 Turks (18%), 14 Roma (0.2%) and 2 others.
At the 2011 census, Băneasa had 3538 Romanians (70.52%), 1145 Turks (22.82%), 332 Roma (6.61%) and 2 others.

References

Communes in Constanța County
Localities in Northern Dobruja
Populated places in Constanța County